The Panther Kallista replaced the Panther Lima as Panther's volume model for the 1980s.  

Unlike the Vauxhall-based Lima, the Kallista used Ford mechanicals, including a range of engines from 1.6 L straight-4 to 2.9 L Cologne V6. Like its predecessor, it featured styling resembling earlier Allard and Morgan cars.

The later SsangYong-built models of the 1990s used a 2.0 L engine. 

The Kallista used an aluminum body over a purpose-built steel chassis. Performance was good, with a sprint to 60 mph (96.6 km/h) taking under 8 seconds.

SsangYong 
The Kallista was produced from 1982 through 1990 until SsangYong Motor Company released a badge engineered version in 1992 called the SsangYong Kallista. Only 78 of the SsangYong models were ever built.

Sources and further reading

Kallista
Retro-style automobiles
Roadsters
Cars introduced in 1982
Cars introduced in 1992
Cars discontinued in 1993